The brown-crested flycatcher (Myiarchus tyrannulus) is a passerine bird in the tyrant flycatcher family.

Description
Adult brown-crested flycatchers are probably the largest species of the Myiarchus flycatchers but vary considerably in size across their range, those in M. t. tyrannulus averaging rather smaller than the largest which are M. t. magister. Brown-crested Flycatcher (Myiarchus tyrannulus), version 1.0. In Birds of the World (A. F. Poole and F. B. Gill, Editors). Cornell Lab of Ornithology, Ithaca, NY, USA. Brown-crested flycatchers have heavy bills. The upperparts are olive brown, with a darker head and short crest. The breast is grey and the belly is lemon yellow. The brown tail feathers have rufous inner webs, the remiges have rufous outer webs, and there are two dull wing bars. The sexes are similar.

The brown-crested flycatcher is best separated from other confusingly similar Myiarchus species by its call, a rough loud "come HERE, come HERE" or "whit-will-do, whit-will-do".

Distribution and ecology
The brown-crested flycatcher breeds in open woodland from southern California, southern Nevada, central Arizona, and southern Texas. It is found in almost all of Brazil, with the exception of some areas of the Amazon southward to Argentina and Bolivia, and on Trinidad and Tobago. It is resident in most of its range, but individuals breeding in the United States retreat to Mexico or southern Florida in winter.

This species is a rather skulking insectivore which catches its prey by flycatching amongst the undergrowth. It sometimes eats fruit, such as the "gumbo-limbo", Bursera simaruba. The nest is built in a tree cavity or similar natural or man-made hole, and the normal clutch is two or three purple-marked cream eggs.

References

Further reading

External links

 
 
 
 

brown-crested flycatcher
Birds of Central America
Birds of South America
brown-crested flycatcher
brown-crested flycatcher